Eric Hamber Secondary School is a public secondary school located in the South Cambie neighbourhood  of Vancouver, British Columbia, Canada. Eric Hamber is a comprehensive secondary school with approximately 1400 students. Each year, approximately 70% of the senior class graduate with honours standing. The school is named after Eric Hamber, former Lieutenant Governor of British Columbia. The school colours, maroon and light blue, were the colours used by Eric Hamber's race horses. The school's mascot is a Griffin.

Feeder schools 
The elementary schools in Eric Hamber's catchment area include:
 Annie B.Jamieson Elementary School
 Edith Cavell Elementary School
 Emily Carr Elementary School
 General Wolfe Elementary School
 L'École Bilingue Elementary School
 Simon Fraser Elementary School
 Sir William Osler Elementary School
 Sir William Van Horne Elementary School

Programs

Challenge Studio Program 
The Challenge Studio Program presents qualifying students with an academically challenging accelerated Grade 8 to 12 program that encompasses both acceleration and enrichment. Students in the program complete three years of study in Grades 8 and 9. Learners in Grades 10 to 12 study in enriched and Advanced Placement courses as well as through guided independent or concurrent post-secondary studies.

Mandarin Bilingual Program 
Eric Hamber offers a Mandarin Accelerated program for Grade 8 and 9 students who have completed the Mandarin Bilingual program at Jamieson Elementary School.

Fashion Design and Technology 
Eric Hamber has the largest high school fashion design program in western Canada. The program was started in 1992 by Nina Ho. Many graduates from Eric Hamber Secondary's fashion design program complete post secondary fashion programs in Canada, the United States, Europe and Asia and work in the fashion design field, including with companies such as Lululemon, Aritzia and Mac and Jac. Eric Hamber students have won awards locally, provincially, and nationally at the Skills Canada Competition. A show is presented every year to showcase the students' work.

Theatre Hamber 
The Eric Hamber Theatre department runs four mainstage and four junior theatre productions (the "Footlights") each school year. The mainstage productions usually include a guest-directed play, musical and student-written play.

Math and Science Honours 
The Math and Science Honours programs allow students to complete three years of study in two school years. However, the programs also teach various topics that are not typically covered in the BC curriculum. As of May 2021, the Honours programs have been canceled for succeeding years.

Eric Hamber's Run for the Sun 
On May 27, 2011, Eric Hamber held an event called "Run for the Sun" to raise money to install four solar panels on the school's roof. The solar panels are being used to heat the water in the school year round. A total of 653 students from 26 classes participated in the event by running or walking for five kilometres. The event raised a total of $8,495, and acceptance of a Vancouver Foundation Generation Green award of $12,500 raised a total of $21,000.

Media 
The Griffins' Nest is Hamber's student-led, independent newspaper, and was founded in 2012. The paper transformed over the course of the 2020/2021 school year and drew praise from several external organizations, including the Canadian Association of Journalists, Student Press Law Center, Canadian Youth Journalism Project, J-Source, British Columbia Civil Liberties Association, Canadian University Press, and Ryerson University Centre for Free Expression. The newspaper has a history of public-interest reporting, and its student journalists have refused censorship on numerous occasions. A May 2021 censorship dispute between school administration/the school board and the Nest led Editors to draft the Student Press Freedom Act, Canada's first student journalism protection legislation.

Football 
In 2010, under the direction of PE Teacher Bobby Gibson, Eric Hamber became the only public school in Vancouver to have an American Football program. In the 2010 season, the Eric Hamber Griffins competed in the Junior Varsity AA league only. In the 2011 season, the Griffins competed with teams in both the Junior Varsity AA and Varsity Tier II leagues. In 2012, both the Junior Varsity and Varsity teams competed in the AA league. That year, the Junior Varsity team made the playoffs, becoming the first Griffins Football team to do so, losing in the first round. In 2013, the Griffins Junior Varsity team competed in an amalgamated AA/AAA league while the Varsity team was relegated at the school's request to the Tier II development league. The Junior Varsity team failed to make the playoffs while the Varsity team was defeated in the first round of the Tier II championship.

Beginning in 2014, Eric Hamber stopped fielding both a Junior Varsity and Varsity team, opting to join the teams and compete with a roster consisting of Grade 9 to 12 players in the Tier II development League. In the 2014 season, the Griffins made it to the final of the Tier II Provincial Championship. In 2015, the Griffins continued to field only one team, with that team losing in the semi-finals of the provincial tournament.

Starting in 2012, Eric Hamber began a Grade 8 football program in the spring. The team does not play in the formal Grade 8 fall league but organizes exhibition games with other schools during the spring sports season. The program also organizes a flag football program in the spring for feeder elementary schools to promote a culture of football amongst students who are likely to eventually attend to Eric Hamber.

Eric Hamber Griffins Football runs with relative independence from the athletics department of the school due to its unique province-wide league and player-based funding. Player fees range from $250–300 based on the season and funding is available for those who cannot afford the costs.

Seismic upgrade 
The Eric Hamber Seismic Replacement Project consists of an entirely new building. The replacement school will be approximately 15,600 meters. The $80 million school replacement will be the largest seismic project in Vancouver history with construction to start in late 2020.

In media 
One of the parking lots at Eric Hamber was extensively used in the early days of television series 21 Jump Street, including a confrontation involving Johnny Depp. It was later used as the high school in the 2007 film Juno. Eric Hamber was used for the filming of TV series iZombie in November 2015. In late 2020, Hamber was used for the filming of the Netflix TV series Riverdale.

Canada Sings 
In 2011, several of Eric Hamber's staff were part of a glee club called "The Edutones" on the show Canada Sings. They defeated the opposing The Distillery Restaurants Corporation's "Run DRC" glee club and won $10,000 for the BC Children's Hospital Foundation. They appeared on episode 6 of season 1 which aired on September 8, 2011.

Notable alumni 

 Michael Benyaer, (Class of 1988), actor and cartoon and video game voice actor
 Fred Cheng, (Class of 2001), Hong Kong television actor and singer, the winner of The Voice of Stars
 Katie Findlay, (Class of 2008), actress, star of The Carrie Diaries
 C. E. Gatchalian, (Class of 1992), award-winning playwright, poet and fictionist
 Gregory Henriquez, (1977-1980), Architect
 Aisha Sasha John, (Class of 1998) dancer and poet
 Ori Kowarsky, (Class of 1988), screenwriter and director of Various Positions, winner of the 2002 Prix de Montréal
 Kristin Kreuk, (Class of 2000), Canadian actress, star of Television show Smallville
 Jenny Kwan, (Class of 1984), member of Legislative Assembly of British Columbia
 Jen Sookfong Lee, (Class of 1994), author of The Better Mother
 Patty Loverock, (Class of 1971), sprinter, set the Canadian record for 100 meters in 1975, competed in 1976 Summer Olympics
 Scott McNeil, (Class of 1980), Voice Actor
 Mayko Nguyen, (Class of 1998) Canadian actress, star of Canadian film Going the Distance and television series Rent-A-Goalie
 Darryl O'Young, (Class of 1998) Hong Kong race car driver
 Jon Mikl Thor, (Class of 1971), heavy metal musician, bodybuilder and former Mr. Canada and Mr. USA
 Jessica Trisko, (Class of 2001), crowned Miss Earth 2007
 Steve Wilson, (Class of 1982), former pitcher for the Los Angeles Dodgers
 Jacqueline Wong Sum-wing, (Class of 2007), first runner-up for Miss Hong Kong 2012
 Benny Yau, (Class of 1998) Canadian singer and television personality

External links 
 
The Griffins' Nest - Student Newspaper

References 

High schools in Vancouver
Educational institutions established in 1962
1962 establishments in British Columbia